Noosa Christian College is a co-educational Primary and Secondary College, located in Cooroy, near Noosa, Queensland, Australia. The college is owned and operated by the Seventh-day Adventist Church and its sister college, Northpine Christian College, is located in Dakabin, Queensland, approximately 1 hour south of Cooroy. It is a part of the Seventh-day Adventist education system, the world's second largest Christian school system.

History
Principal Ross Reid established the school in 2003. It has grown into a Kindergarten to Year 12 school with a one-to-one laptop program for the Secondary College (Years 7 to 12). In 2011, the school celebrated its first graduation of a year 12 class.
 
During the 2011 year, the Hon John Hogg, Senator for Queensland and President of the Australian Senate, officially opened a new 2 million library funded entirely by the Australian Government Building Education Revolution (BER) scheme. Noosa Christian College is one of 55 Adventist schools in Australia. These Adventist schools have received A$100 million as part of the Australian government's education modernisation program.

Spiritual aspects
All students take religion classes each year that they are enrolled. These classes cover topics in biblical history and Christian and denominational doctrines. The student body meet once a week for a chapel service in two groups, one for primary students and the other secondary students.

Sports
The college offers touch football for Year 1 to Year 12, senior and junior boys and girls teams.

See also

 Seventh-day Adventist education
 List of schools in Queensland
 List of Seventh-day Adventist secondary schools

References

External links 
 
 Queensland Education Department Schools Directory listing

Private primary schools in Queensland
Private secondary schools in Queensland
Schools on the Sunshine Coast, Queensland
Educational institutions established in 2003
Adventist secondary schools in Australia
Adventist primary schools in Australia
2003 establishments in Australia
Shire of Noosa
Cooroy, Queensland